Nobu McCarthy (born Nobu Atsumi (渥美 延); November 13, 1934 – April 6, 2002) was a Canadian actress. She received a nomination for the Independent Spirit Award for Best Female Lead for her performance in the film The Wash.

Early life
McCarthy was born Nobu Atsumi in Ottawa, Ontario, the daughter of Masaji and Yuki Atsumi. Her father was a Japanese fashion designer and diplomatic attaché stationed in Canada at the time. She was raised in Japan, where she studied ballet. A modeling career eventually led to a beauty pageant in which she won the title of "Miss Tokyo". She married army sergeant David McCarthy in 1955 and moved to the United States.

Career
While shopping in the Little Tokyo district of Los Angeles, McCarthy was discovered by talent agent Fred Ishimoto, which led to her film debut in The Geisha Boy (1958). In 1960, she appeared in the comedy film Wake Me When It's Over.

She starred with Lloyd Bridges in a 1959 Sea Hunt television episode as a Hawaiian woman fighting to protect pearl-beds from poachers. In 1962 she appeared in the television series Wagon Train in the episode "The John Augustus Story" as Mayleen. For the next decade, McCarthy continued acting, appearing in smaller roles in a number of films as well as guest spots on television, including the title role in the 1960 episode "Princess of Crazy Creek" of the syndicated western series Pony Express, starring Grant Sullivan.

In 1961, she appeared as Haru in the Laramie series episode "Dragon at the Door". She also appeared in the ABC adventure dramas Adventures in Paradise and The Islanders. During this time she made two guest appearances on Perry Mason: in 1959 she played defendant Mitsou Kamuri in "The Case of the Blushing Pearls," and in 1965 she played Sally Choshi in "The Case of the Wrongful Writ."

She also guest starred on ABC's The Bing Crosby Show in the 1964-1965 season. In the final, 1966, season of Mister Ed, she played Mei Ling, a Chinese restaurant manager and spy.  She starred with Robert Conrad in the final episode of the First Season of The Wild Wild West, dated April 22, 1966 "The Night of the Sudden Plague" as a Chinese woman "Anna Kirby", who is the daughter of a mad professor breeding bacteria for a serum that causes temporary paralysis. She also made appearances in Batman, The Man From U.N.C.L.E., Hawaii Five-O and Love, American Style.

In 1970, the McCarthys divorced; they had two children.

In 1971, McCarthy joined East West Players, an Asian American theatre group in Los Angeles. In 1973, she appeared in a second-season episode of Kung Fu.  In 1976, she appeared in an episode of Barney Miller as prostitute/robbery victim Dorothy Murakami. She then starred in the television movie Farewell to Manzanar, based on the novel of the same title. That year she also married attorney William J. Cuthbert, though she kept McCarthy as her stage name. She made an appearance in an episode of the television sitcoms Happy Days and Diff'rent Strokes. She appeared in three episodes of The Love Boat. In 1986 she had a supporting role opposite Pat Morita in the film The Karate Kid Part II.

Her starring role in the indie feature The Wash, opposite Mako, earned her an Independent Spirit Award nomination in 1989. That same year she replaced Mako as artistic director of East West Players, a position she held until 1993. During this time, McCarthy also taught theatre at California State University, Los Angeles and UCLA.  East West Players presented McCarthy with a lifetime achievement award in 1996, and the Visionary Award in 1999. McCarthy also did the voice-overs at the beginning and end of Picture Bride.Later years
In 1976, six years after her divorce from David McCarthy, Nobu married William Cuthbert.

Death
On April 6, 2002, McCarthy died at the age of 67 from a ruptured aortic aneurysm while she was on location in Brazil, filming Gaijin - Ama-me Como Sou''.

Filmography

See also

Portrayal of East Asians in Hollywood
Stereotypes of East Asians in the United States

References

External links
 

1934 births
2002 deaths
Actresses from Ottawa
Canadian actresses of Japanese descent
Canadian expatriate actresses in the United States
Canadian film actresses
Canadian stage actresses
Canadian television actresses
Deaths from aortic aneurysm
Female models from Ontario